Ivel (also Romanized as Īvel; also known as Īdel) is a village in Poshtkuh Rural District, Chahardangeh District, Sari County, Mazandaran Province, Iran. At the 2006 census, its population was 137, in 49 families.

References 

Populated places in Sari County